Metallyticus fallax is a species of praying mantis found in Southeast Asia. It has an iridescent appearance. It is very similar to Metallyticus splendidus.

Biology and Ecology 
Metallyticus fallax has several pleisomorphic morphological traits, such as its short prothorax and lack of discoidal spines. It has more ventral cervical sclerites than Metallyticus  splendidus.

This mantis tends to rest underneath the bark of trees, feeding on butterflies, termites, flies, and mainly on cockroaches. They also chase after their prey, rather than ambushing them like most mantis species.

References

Insects of Southeast Asia
Metallyticus
Insects described in 1917